Fayette Oliver Farwell (December 1858 – 24 May 1935), co-creator of the Adams-Farwell automobile manufacturing company, was a prolific American inventor with at least thirteen patents credited to his name.

Patents

camp chair ........................October 10, 1887
camp chair support ...............July 14, 1890
cash carrier ........................March 10, 1891
stove back ........................March 23, 1892
stove damper .....................April 27, 1892
combined anvil and vise.........April 5, 1894
non-conducting handle.........June 7, 1894
stovepipe damper...............August 21, 1894
molding machine...............September 16, 1895
front grate........................October 25, 1895
oven shelf........................November 4, 1895
milling machine..................February 25, 1896
sand press........................August 28, 1897
current controller/igniting devices for hydrocarbon engines........ October 21, 1904
lubricator........................November 17, 1904
milling machine...............December 9, 1908
molding machine...............November 4, 1910
internal combustion motor ...February 28, 1911
gear-hobbing machine.........June 10, 1911 
driving mechanism for machine spindles............January 23, 1919

Lesser known was Farwell's development of a timing device that allowed machine gun bullets to be fired through the whirling propellers of airplanes without striking the blades. Near the time of World War I, Farwell was called to Washington, D.C. by the War Department to further refine his ideas. Farwell left Dubuque in 1921 to demonstrate a merry-go-round he had patented. He sold a phonograph invention to the Victor Talking Machine Company. He returned to the gear-cutting business in Toledo. Three sons-Jay, Ray, and Fay survived him.

References

1858 births
1935 deaths
American inventors
Date of birth unknown